The Bruce-Grey Catholic District School Board (BGCDSB, known as English-language Separate District School Board No. 35 prior to 1999) is a separate school board in the province of Ontario which manages Catholic elementary and secondary schools located in Bruce and Grey Counties, including the Owen Sound area.

Schools governed by BGCDSB

Secondary schools
St. Mary's High School, Owen Sound
Sacred Heart High School, Walkerton

Elementary schools
Holy Family School, Hanover
Immaculate Conception School, Formosa
Mary Immaculate School, Chepstow
Mother Teresa School, Walkerton
Notre Dame School, Owen Sound
St. Anthony's School, Kincardine
St. Basil's School, Owen Sound
St. Joseph's School, Port Elgin
St. Peter & St. Paul's School, Durham
Sacred Heart School, Mildmay
Sacred Heart School, Teeswater

Other School Boards in the area
Bluewater District School Board
Simcoe County District School Board
Simcoe Muskoka Catholic District School Board

See also
List of school districts in Ontario
List of high schools in Ontario

References

External links
BGCDSB website

Education in Bruce County
Education in Grey County
Roman Catholic school districts in Ontario